Schenefeld is an Amt ("collective municipality") in the district of Steinburg, in Schleswig-Holstein, Germany. The seat of the Amt is in Schenefeld.

The Amt Schenefeld consists of the following municipalities:

References

Ämter in Schleswig-Holstein